The Giant Eagle LPGA Classic was an official golf tournament on the LPGA Tour held in the Youngstown, Ohio area.

From its beginnings in 1990 until 1992, it was known as The Phar-Mor in Youngstown and was held at Squaw Creek Country Club in Vienna Township, Ohio. It became the Youngstown-Warren LPGA Classic in 1993 and was held at Avalon Lakes Golf Club in Warren, Ohio until 2000. In 1997, Pittsburgh-based grocery store chain Giant Eagle took over the title sponsorship of the tournament.  The tournament returned to Squaw Creek in 2001.  The last tournament was held in 2004.

Winners
Giant Eagle LPGA Classic
2004 Moira Dunn
2003 Rachel Teske
2002 Mi Hyun Kim
2001 Dorothy Delasin
2000 Dorothy Delasin
1999 Jackie Gallagher-Smith
1998 Se Ri Pak
1997 Tammie Green

Youngstown-Warren LPGA Classic
1996 Michelle McGann
1995 Michelle McGann
1994 Tammie Green
1993 Nancy Lopez

The Phar-Mor in Youngstown
1992 Betsy King
1991 Deb Richard
1990 Beth Daniel

References

External links
Coverage on the LPGA Tour's official site
List of winners up to 2003

Former LPGA Tour events
Golf in Ohio
Sports in Youngstown, Ohio
Warren, Ohio
History of women in Ohio